Dóra Agnes Kisteleki (born 11 May 1983 in Budapest) is a female water polo player from Hungary, who competed for her native country at the 2004 Summer Olympics in Athens, Greece. There she finished in sixth place with the Hungary national team. A year later she was on the side that claimed the world title in Montréal, Quebec, Canada.

See also
 List of world champions in women's water polo
 List of World Aquatics Championships medalists in water polo

References
 Profile

External links
 

1983 births
Living people
Hungarian female water polo players
Olympic water polo players of Hungary
Water polo players at the 2004 Summer Olympics
Water polo players at the 2008 Summer Olympics
Water polo players from Budapest
World Aquatics Championships medalists in water polo
21st-century Hungarian women